The 2010 Ixian Grand Aegean Tennis Cup was a professional tennis tournament played on outdoor hard courts. It was part of the Tretorn SERIE+ of the 2010 ATP Challenger Tour. It took place in Rhodes, Greece between April 26 and May 2, 2010.

Champions

Singles

 Dudi Sela def.  Rainer Schüttler, 7–6(3), 6–3

Doubles

 Dustin Brown /  Simon Stadler def.  Jonathan Marray /  Jamie Murray, 7-6(4), 6-7(4), [10-7]

ATP entrants

Seeds

Rankings are as of April 19, 2010.

Other entrants

The following players received entry from the qualifying draw:
  Denis Gremelmayr
  Mikhail Ledovskikh
  Andis Juška
  Andrej Martin

Top Greek Players

References
Official website
ITF search 

Ixian Grand Aegean Tennis Cup
Tennis tournaments in Greece
2010 in Greek tennis
Sport in Rhodes
Events in Rhodes